Movia may refer to:

 Alstom Movia, a family of metro train cars built by Alstom (initially Bombardier)
 Movia (transit agency), a public transport agency in Copenhagen, Denmark
 Dinornis or Movia, an extinct genus of birds